The Independence of Malaya Party was a political party in British-ruled Malaya that stood for political independence. Founded by Onn Ja'afar after he left UMNO in 1951, it opposed the UMNO policy of Malay supremacy.

The party was open to all races of Malaya, but received support mainly from ethnic Indians. The IMP headquarters were in what is now the landmark Sultan Abdul Samad Building.

The IMP contested in the 1952 Kuala Lumpur Municipal Elections in alliance with the Malayan Indian Congress under Dato' Onn and other non-communal organisations. However the 1952 elections proved the MIC's attempt to preach and practise non-communalism would not prevail in Malayan politics when communalism was the winning factor.

The IMP won its only seat in the 1952 municipal elections via Devaki Krishnan. Thus she became the first woman in the country to be elected to public office. In her 1952 election manifesto, she stated, "I will interest myself particularly in the lot of the women of Kuala Lumpur and in extending the programme of social work already carried out by the municipality."

After noticing that support for the party was unfavourable, Onn dissolved the party in 1953 and formed the Parti Negara.

See also
Politics of Malaysia
List of political parties in Malaysia
Parti Negara

References 

1951 establishments in Malaya
1953 disestablishments in Malaya
Political parties established in 1951
Political parties disestablished in 1953
Defunct political parties in Malaysia